Picocystis is a monotypic genus of green algae, the sole species is Picocystis salinarum. It is placed within its own class, Picocystophyceae in the division Chlorophyta.

Structure 
Picocystis salinarum cells under normal conditions have a spherical or oval shape.  Their size ranges from 2 to 3μm (micrometer, 10^-6) in diameter. Under conditions of nutrient depletion they appear to form a trillobe shape. This trillobe shape gives it the nickname Mickey Mouse, due to its appearance to the famous character's head. The general appearance resembles that of a standard green algae.

The pigments are composed mainly from chlorophyll a and b and the carotenoids violaxanthin, alloxanthin, monadoxanthin, neoxanthin, lutein, diatoxanthin and zeaxanthin.

The cell wall is mainly composed of polymers of the monosaccharide arabinose, polyarabinose.

Habitat 
The species have been found in saline or hypersaline alkaline environments.

References

External links 

Chlorophyta genera
Monotypic algae genera
Chlorophyta